Ettore Gironda (died 1626) was a Roman Catholic prelate who served as Bishop of Massa Lubrense (1611–1626).

Biography
On 24 January 1611, Ettore Gironda was appointed during the papacy of Pope Paul V as Bishop of Massa Lubrense.
He served as Bishop of Massa Lubrense until his death in 1626.

See also 
Catholic Church in Italy

References

External links and additional sources
 (for Chronology of Bishops) 
 (for Chronology of Bishops) 

1626 deaths
17th-century Italian Roman Catholic bishops
Bishops appointed by Pope Paul V